Joaquín Gómez (born 19 June 1967) is a Mexican rower. He competed at the 1988 Summer Olympics and the 1992 Summer Olympics.

References

1967 births
Living people
Mexican male rowers
Olympic rowers of Mexico
Rowers at the 1988 Summer Olympics
Rowers at the 1992 Summer Olympics
Place of birth missing (living people)
Pan American Games medalists in rowing
Pan American Games gold medalists for Mexico
Pan American Games silver medalists for Mexico
Rowers at the 1987 Pan American Games
Rowers at the 1991 Pan American Games
Medalists at the 1987 Pan American Games
Medalists at the 1991 Pan American Games
20th-century Mexican people
21st-century Mexican people